The Rangers Take Over is a 1942 American Western film directed by Albert Herman and written by Elmer Clifton. The film stars Dave O'Brien, James Newill, Guy Wilkerson, Iris Meredith, Forrest Taylor and I. Stanford Jolley. The film was released on December 25, 1942, by Producers Releasing Corporation.

The film is the first of PRC's 22-film "Texas Rangers" series starring Dave O'Brien, James Newill and Guy Wilkerson.

James Newill sings three songs in the film co-written by Newill and O'Brien: "The Rangers Take Over", "High in the Saddle" and "Campfire on the Prairie".

Plot
Tex Wyatt, a new recruit, is assigned by his father to investigate cattle rustlings. He's thrown off the force for disobeying orders, and goes undercover with the rustler gang. Working with rangers Jim Steele and Panhandle Perkins, he busts the gang, and earns his spot on the force again.

Cast          
Dave O'Brien as Tex Wyatt 
James Newill as Jim Steele 
Guy Wilkerson as Panhandle Perkins
Iris Meredith as Jean Lorin
Forrest Taylor as Capt. John Wyatt
I. Stanford Jolley as Rance Blair
Charles King as Kip Lane 
Carl Mathews as Slocum 
Harry Harvey Sr. as Bill Summers
Lynton Brent as Block Nelson 
Bud Osborne as Pete Dawson 
Cal Shrum as Cal Shrum

See also
The Texas Rangers series:
 The Rangers Take Over (1942)
 Bad Men of Thunder Gap (1943)
 West of Texas (1943)
 Border Buckaroos (1943)
 Fighting Valley (1943)
 Trail of Terror (1943)
 The Return of the Rangers (1943)
 Boss of Rawhide (1943)
 Outlaw Roundup (1944)
 Guns of the Law (1944)
 The Pinto Bandit (1944)
 Spook Town (1944)
 Brand of the Devil (1944)
 Gunsmoke Mesa (1944)
 Gangsters of the Frontier (1944)
 Dead or Alive (1944)
 The Whispering Skull (1944)
 Marked for Murder (1945)
 Enemy of the Law (1945)
 Three in the Saddle (1945)
 Frontier Fugitives (1945)
 Flaming Bullets (1945)

References

External links
 

1942 films
American Western (genre) films
1942 Western (genre) films
Producers Releasing Corporation films
Films directed by Albert Herman
American black-and-white films
1940s English-language films
1940s American films